Kelvin Ewome Matute (born ) is a Cameroonian footballer. He currently plays in Italy for Taranto.

Career

Club career
Ewome began his career in Italy with Sarone Calcio (an amateur soccer club based in Pordenone) in 2005. However, he was noticed by Udinese, and in 2006 he joined the young team. During the season, he didn't play for the first team, but gained the shirt number 16.

In February 2008 he was involved in an investigation by the Procura della Repubblica di Udine over the alleged falsification of documents. According to the Director of football of Cameroon side Acada Sport, the Italian Stefano Cusin, Ewome was born in 1985 and, during the 2005 Torneo di Viareggio played for the Africans, he left the club and changed identity. However the investigation acknowledged that Matute was born in 1988, but due to this he was allowed to play only 6 games for the young team.

He was sent on loan to Lega Pro Prima Divisione club Arezzo for the 2008–09 season, where he made 32 appearances, scoring 2 goals. The team ended the season at the fourth place and reached the playoffs where was sent off by Crotone. Ewome played both legs.

On June 26, 2009 Arezzo exercised the option to obtain the 50% of the player, but three days later Udinese exercised his option to obtain the whole rights of the player.

The following season he joined on loan Cesena. He made his debut for Cesena on August 29, 2009 as a 64th-minute substitute in a 2–0 away winning game against Gallipoli. During the season, he collected 9 caps and made one goal against Salernitana. Cesena ended the season at the Second place and were directly promoted in Serie A. 
On 11 August 2010 he joined Triestina on loan from Udinese.

Crotone
In January 2011 he was signed by F.C. Crotone in co-ownership deal. In June 2011 Udinese gave up the remain 50% registration rights to Crotone.

Matute spent  season with the Serie B club, as no.26 of the team.

Pro Vercelli
Matute joined Pro Vercelli at the start of 2014–15 Serie B season as free agent. He wore no.20 shirt for his new team. On 14 January 2015 Matute returned to Crotone, with Mattia Sprocati moved to Vercelli. His shirt number was changed to no.14.

Serie D
He joined Serie D club Avellino on 25 August 2018. On 25 July 2019, he moved to Taranto.

References

External links
 Profile at AIC.Football.it 
 Profile at Gazzetta.it 
 

1988 births
Living people
People from Buea
Cameroonian footballers
Cameroonian expatriate footballers
S.S. Arezzo players
A.C. Cesena players
U.S. Triestina Calcio 1918 players
F.C. Crotone players
Latina Calcio 1932 players
F.C. Pro Vercelli 1892 players
U.S. Avellino 1912 players
Taranto F.C. 1927 players
Serie B players
Serie C players
Serie D players
Association football midfielders
Expatriate footballers in Italy